Aranda is a Finnish ice-strengthened research vessel built by Wärtsilä Marine in 1989 and owned by the Finnish Environment Institute. A state-of-the-art research vessel equipped for icy conditions, she operates mainly in the Baltic Sea but has also made voyages to the Arctic Sea as well as the areas around Antarctica.

A major overhaul of the ship began on summer 2017. During the maintenance the length of the ship will be increased to accommodate additional research and laboratory facilities. The vessel will also be equipped with an electrical power transmission.

References 

1989 ships
Ships built in Turku
Ships built in Helsinki
Research vessels of Finland